José Paes (born 26 March 1946) is an Ecuadorian footballer. He played in 12 matches for the Ecuador national football team from 1979 to 1981. He was also part of Ecuador's squad for the 1979 Copa América tournament.

References

External links
 

1946 births
Living people
Ecuadorian footballers
Ecuador international footballers
Association football defenders
Barcelona S.C. footballers
Sportspeople from São Paulo